Robert Doherty (12 February 1870 – 19 December 1942) was an English rugby league footballer for the St. Helens club in the English Championship competition. He played as a three-quarter back.

Doherty played in the first Challenge Cup final for St Helens on the wing.

References

External links
St Helens Heritage Society profile

1870 births
1942 deaths
English rugby league players
Rugby league centres
Rugby league players from Kendal
Rugby league wingers
St Helens R.F.C. players